Samsung Galaxy Fit may refer to:

 Samsung Galaxy Fit (smartwatch), a smartwatch released in 2019
 Samsung Galaxy Fit (smartphone), a smartphone released in 2011